Nazzareno Natale (4 April 1938 – 21 June 2006) was an Italian actor

He played Rojo Gang Member in Per un pugno di dollari, Paco in For a Few Dollars More (1965), and Bountyhunter in Il buono il bruto il cattivo (1966), by Sergio Leone, and Wylie in Taste for Killing (1966) and Wild Jack's Man in Day of Anger (1967), by Tonino Valerii. He also appeared in  Giù La Testa (1971).

Selected filmography

References

Bibliography

External links
 

1938 births
2006 deaths
20th-century Italian male actors
21st-century Italian male actors
Male Spaghetti Western actors
Italian male film actors
Italian male television actors